Richard Duke Buchan III (born July 3, 1963) is an American financier, diplomat, farmer and philanthropist. He is the founder and CEO of Hunter Global Investors, a private investment management firm. He served as the United States Ambassador to Spain and Andorra from 2017 to 2021.

Early life and education 
Buchan grew up near Henderson, North Carolina on his family's tobacco and cattle farms. He received a BA in economics and Spanish from the University of North Carolina at Chapel Hill (UNC-CH) in 1985, and an MBA from Harvard Business School in 1991.

At UNC-CH, Buchan was enrolled in the university's study abroad program at the University of Seville, Spain from 1983 to 1984 and also studied at the University of Valencia in 1980. He later commented on his studies in Spain: "The study of the Spanish language, literature and cultures provided me a passport to a world outside the U.S. and instilled in me a global perspective."

Career: Global Finance 
In the early 1990s, Buchan started his investment banking career. From 1992 to 1997, he was an investment banker at Merrill Lynch. There he specialized in global corporate finance, and mergers and acquisitions in the financial services sector in Latin America, the United States and Europe.

In 2001, Buchan founded Hunter Global Investors in New York City. In 2007, Hunter had approximately US$1.5 billion assets under management. After beating U.S. stocks by 46 percent between 2001 and March 2011, Buchan closed one of his funds in December 2011 due to losses stemming from the European debt crisis, and returned money to investors. He converted Hunter Global Investors into a family office to manage his family's assets, and continues to manage two funds, which invest in various industries, including real estate.

Diplomacy 
On November 2, 2017, Buchan was confirmed to his ambassadorships by the United States Senate by voice vote, without any opposition from Democratic or Republican Senators. He was sworn in on December 11, 2017. In 2019 he helped update the bilateral tax agreement to end the double taxation for companies that operate in both countries.

Buchan advocated for democracy and human rights on various fronts, repeatedly speaking out against authoritarian regimes, especially in Venezuela and Cuba.
In November 2019, he traveled to Venezuela's border with Colombia to bring eyewitness attention to the humanitarian crisis caused by the regime of Nicolás Maduro and his primary ally, Cuba. "I saw pregnant Venezuelan women waiting to give birth in an extremely overcrowded maternity ward," Buchan wrote in the Spanish language newspaper El Mundo. "I saw very weak children and the elderly waiting to receive their only meal of the day at a soup kitchen. Children are dying from starvation. The elderly are without medication or care. This must stop now. … It's time to close the door on tyrants."
Buchan met interim Venezuelan President Juan Guaidó in Madrid to reiterate the United States’ strong support for the National Assembly.  The U.S. Embassy was also successful in convincing Spanish oil company Repsol to wind down its operations in Venezuela in order to avoid sanctions.

Politics 
Buchan has served as a Republican National Committee State Victory Chair for both New York and Florida. He has donated extensively to the Republican National Committee, the National Republican Senatorial Committee, the National Republican Congressional Committee, the Republican Governors Association, and individuals such as Ron DeSantis and Marco Rubio. After first supporting former Governor Jeb Bush’s 2016 presidential campaign, and serving on the executive committee of Bush's Right to Rise PAC, Buchan and his wife Hannah became early financial supporters of Donald Trump's presidential campaign.

Philanthropy 
In 2011, Buchan established The Buchan Excellence Fund in UNC-CH's Department of Romance Languages and Literature, "the largest single endowment at Carolina dedicated to support faculty, graduate students and undergraduates in Spanish languages, literature and culture." The fund has helped students and professors further their research on topics in Spanish culture and linguistics, and also enabled them to travel to Spain as well as other Spanish-speaking countries.

In 2012, The Buchan Excellence Fund supported the UNC-CH Department of Romance Languages and Literature's project 21st Century Pen Pals, a video exchange program between American and Spanish schoolchildren.

In December 2016, Buchan House, the new Arts and Sciences Foundation building at UNC-CH, opened after Buchan donated the money to purchase and renovate the old Chapel Hill Public Library to serve as the foundation's new headquarters.

Buchan was Vice-Chair of the UNC-CH Arts and Sciences Foundation Board of Trustees, is a member of the Chancellor's Philanthropic Council, and serves on the University's Campaign Planning Cabinet.

He has also supported Harvard Business School fundraising.

Personal life 
Buchan and his wife Hannah have three children. The family owns and manages farms that grow over 100 varieties of heirloom tomatoes and vegetables and raise horses. The Buchans run a farm stand, develop new varieties of tomatoes, and donate their produce to charities. His primary residence is in Palm Beach, Florida. 

Buchan is fluent in Spanish, conversant in French, and has a basic knowledge of Italian and Catalan.

References

External links

1963 births
Living people
Ambassadors of the United States to Andorra
Ambassadors of the United States to Spain
American philanthropists
American chief executives
University of North Carolina at Chapel Hill alumni
Harvard Business School alumni
American investment bankers
Merrill (company) people
21st-century American diplomats